Whiteclay may refer to the following places:

 Whiteclay, Nebraska, an unincorporated community in the United States
 Whiteclay Lake, a lake in Ontario, Canada

See also
 White Clay (disambiguation)